Penelope Ann Miller (born Penelope Andrea Miller; January 13, 1964), sometimes credited as Penelope Miller, is an American actress.
She began her career on Broadway in the 1985 original production of Biloxi Blues and received a Tony Award nomination for the 1989 revival of Our Town. 

She has appeared in several major Hollywood films, particularly in the late 1980s and early 1990s, including Adventures in Babysitting (1987), Biloxi Blues (1988), Big Top Pee-wee (1988), The Freshman (1990), Awakenings (1990), Kindergarten Cop (1990), Other People's Money (1991), Year of the Comet (1992), and Carlito's Way (1993), for which she received a Golden Globe Award nomination. 

She returned to Broadway in the 1995 original stage production of On the Waterfront.

Miller's other films include a starring role in The Relic (1997) and supporting roles in Chaplin (1992), Along Came a Spider (2001), and The Artist (2011).

Early life
Miller was born in Los Angeles, California, to Beatrice (née Ammidown), a costume designer, publicist, and journalist, and Mark Miller, a television actor and producer. Her mother was the goddaughter of businessman Aristotle Onassis and an editor of Harper's Bazaar. She has two sisters: older, Marisa Miller, who is also a film actress, and younger, Savannah Miller, a social worker.

Miller graduated from high school in Los Angeles and attended Menlo College in Atherton, California for two years from 1981 to 1983, then moved to New York City to study theatre at HB Studio.

Career
Her Broadway theatre break came in 1985 when she was cast in the lead (opposite Matthew Broderick) in the Neil Simon play Biloxi Blues. (She also starred with Broderick in the 1988 film version of that play).
She played a role in one episode ("Death and the Lady") of the television series Miami Vice (which aired on October 16, 1987), and accepted several other small roles in film and television work. She then returned to Broadway in a revival of Our Town; her portrayal of Emily garnered her a Tony award nomination. She then appeared as Pee-wee Herman's (Paul Reubens) fiancée, Winnie Johnston, in the 1988 release of Big Top Pee-wee. She played a supporting role in 1989's "Dead Bang", a cop thriller starring Don Johnson.

In 1990, she played Paula in Awakenings, starring Robert De Niro and Robin Williams. She also appeared in the 1990 movies Downtown, with Anthony Edwards and Forest Whitaker, and Kindergarten Cop, alongside Arnold Schwarzenegger, playing a teacher, hiding with her son Dominic from her criminal drug-dealing husband Cullen Crisp (Richard Tyson).
She subsequently appeared in a number of other theatrical movies, notably as Edna Purviance in Chaplin and with Tim Daly as Margaret "Maggie" Harwood in Peter Yates' film Year Of The Comet, both in 1992, and the following year she appeared as the love interest of Al Pacino's character in Carlito's Way.

Miller co-starred as the daughter of the character played by Marlon Brando in 1990's The Freshman, again opposite Matthew Broderick, and as the lawyer and stepdaughter of the character played by Gregory Peck in 1991's Other People's Money. She appeared as Margo Lane in The Shadow with Alec Baldwin, as well as in the film Miles from Home directed by Gary Sinise.
She had the lead role in the big-budget creature feature The Relic (1997) as Dr. Margo Green. In 1998, she portrayed Barbara Henry in Ruby Bridges a made-for-television movie that was made by the Disney company, about Ruby Bridges, the first black student to attend an all-white elementary school in New Orleans. In 2000, she played the scandalous teacher Mary Kay Letourneau in the TV version of a true story, All-American Girl: The Mary Kay Letourneau Story.

In 2002, Miller starred in the film Dead in a Heartbeat and in a two-part episode of A&E's series A Nero Wolfe Mystery. Her 2005 film Funny Money was voted the top film of the Sarasota Film Festival. She appeared in the Fox series Vanished for six episodes, playing the ex-wife of a U.S. senator whose wife has mysteriously disappeared. Her 2007 comedy Blonde Ambition co-starring Jessica Simpson and Luke Wilson, which is considered as a brilliant & cult film for its writing and for the many references it has. She guest-starred as Fran on Desperate Housewives.
Miller appeared in the horror film The Messengers, co-starring Dylan McDermott and Kristen Stewart. The film was produced by director Sam Raimi's production company, Ghost House Pictures.
In 2011, she portrayed Doris, the wife of protagonist George Valentin (Jean Dujardin), in the Academy Award-winning film The Artist.

After a recurring role on the ABC soap series Mistresses, Miller was cast in 2015 as a regular in the first season of ABC's drama series American Crime.

In October 2020, Miller was cast as First Lady Nancy Reagan in Reagan, an upcoming 2023 biographical film based on the life of President Ronald Reagan.

Personal life
In 1994, Miller married actor Will Arnett. They divorced in 1995.

Miller married James Huggins, and they have two daughters: Eloisa May and Maria Adela. On March 14, 2012, Miller filed for legal separation from Huggins after 12 years of marriage. On June 15, 2012, Miller withdrew her request for separation.

Filmography

Film

Television films

Television series

Awards and nominations

References

External links

 
 
 Penelope Ann Miller at Internet Off-Broadway Database

1964 births
20th-century American actresses
21st-century American actresses
Actresses from Los Angeles
American film actresses
American stage actresses
American television actresses
Living people
Menlo College alumni
University High School (Los Angeles) alumni